Brenzone sul Garda is a comune (municipality) in the Province of Verona in the Italian region of Veneto, located on the eastern shore of Lake Garda about  west of Venice and about  northwest of Verona.

The municipality of Brenzone is formed by the frazioni (subdivisions, mainly villages and hamlets) of Assenza, Biaza, Campo, Castelletto, Castello, Magugnano (municipal seat), Marniga, Porto, and Sommavilla.

Brenzone borders the following municipalities: Ferrara di Monte Baldo, Gargnano, Malcesine, San Zeno di Montagna, Tignale, Torri del Benaco, and Tremosine.

References

External links
 Official website 
Official Portal with information and utilities about Brenzone
Brenzone.biz Non profit portal with information and utilities about Brenzone

Cities and towns in Veneto
Populated places on Lake Garda